Mount Myōjō or Myōjōgatake is a mountain with an altitude of 924 meters on the border of Odawara and Hakone, Kanagawa, as one of the ancient sommas on Mount Hakone's old outer rim. It is part of Fuji-Hakone-Izu National Park.

Although it is a low mountain of less than 1,000 meters in Hakone, it looks high from Odawara, with the Evening Star shining above it, so it got its name "Myojo" which means the Evening or Morning Star. The trail from this mountain to Mount Kintoki via Mount Myōjin (Kanagawa) is one of the most popular hiking trails in Mount Hakone

In the evening of August 16th, the last day of the annual Bon Festival, the Burning of the Character Big ritual (:ja:大文字焼き) is conducted on Mount Myōjin, as part of the Hakone Gora Summer Festival.

See also
Fuji-Hakone-Izu National Park

References

External link

Mountains of Kanagawa Prefecture
Hakone, Kanagawa